Pockets are an American R&B band. They had three top 40 R&B hits in the late 1970s. They are best known for their single "Come Go With Me".

History
The Baltimore based band was firstly dubbed the Pockets by singer Luther Ingram as a description of their musical style. As a septet the band went on to record several demos at Sheffield Studios in 1975. Being mostly top 40 covers and four original songs these records didn't make much of an impact. With this being so band member Al McKinney eventually met up with John Mackey of the Baltimore Colts. Mackey happened to be Verdine White's next-door neighbor and thus a cassette of the group was passed along to White who became impressed. White went on to bring in Larry Jacobs from San Francisco to be the group's lead vocalist. As an eight-man band the Pockets got signed in 1977 to Columbia Records. The group then started recording their first album which was being produced by White.

Entitled Come Go With Us the Pockets' debut LP was issued in October 1977 by Columbia. Come Go With Us got to no. 17 upon the Billboard Top R&B Albums charts.
The album's lead single "Come Go With Me" also rose to nos. 17 & 32 upon the Billboard Hot R&B Songs and Dance Club Songs charts. 

The Pockets' sophomore album Take It On Up was issued in 1978 on Columbia Records. The LP was executively produced by Maurice White with Verdine White and Robert Wright also serving as producers. The album reached No. 22 on the Billboard Top Soul Albums chart. The LP's title track reached No. 24 on the Billboard Hot Soul Songs chart.

They would go on to have a third R&B top 40 hit with "So Delicious" which made it to no 34. Other songs that charted were "Catch Me", and "Happy for Love". The latter charted at 69 in the R&B chart and no 79 in the dance chart.

The band eventually reformed and along with another classic R&B act Breakwater went about a tour of the United Kingdom during 2016 & 2017.

Members

Original lineup
 Kevin Barnes - trombone, vocals, percussion
 Gary Grainger - bass, vocals
 Gregory Grainger - percussionist, vocals, aux drummer
 George Gray - drums, vocals, percussion 
 Larry Jacobs - vocals, percussion
 Albert McKinney - keyboards, vocals
 Irving Madison - saxophone, vocals, percussion 
 Jacob Sheffer - guitar, percussion
 Charles "Chuck" Williams - trumpet, flugelhorn, trombone, vocals, percussion

2016/2017 line up
 Craig Alsten
 Rick Aspel
 Greg Boyer
 Chris Fischer
 Gary Grainger
 Greg Grainger
 Freedom Imani
 Larry Jacobs
 Marshall Keyes
 Robert Wawa Legrand
 Edgar Montalvo
 David Ylvisaker
 Bryan Fox (Special guest)

Discography

Albums

Singles

References

External links
 Website

Soul musicians
Musicians from Baltimore